Ortholepis is a genus of moths of the family Pyralidae described by Émile Louis Ragonot in 1887.

Species
Ortholepis baloghi Neunzig, 2003
Ortholepis betulae (Goeze, 1776)
Ortholepis cretaciella de Joannis, 1927
Ortholepis jugosella Ragonot, 1887
Ortholepis myricella McDunnough, 1958
Ortholepis pasadamia (Dyar, 1917)
Ortholepis polyodonta Balinsky, 1991
Ortholepis pyrobasis Balinsky, 1991
Ortholepis rectilineella (Ragonot, 1888)
Ortholepis rhodorella McDunnough, 1958
Ortholepis subgenistella (Hampson, 1901)
Ortholepis vacciniella (Lienig & Zeller, 1846)

References

Phycitini
Taxa named by Émile Louis Ragonot
Pyralidae genera